Fernando Sabsay (1919–2007) was an Argentine historian and teacher.

20th-century Argentine historians
Argentine male writers
1919 births
2007 deaths
Male non-fiction writers